The Sun Odyssey 34.2, also called the Jeanneau 34.2, is a French sailboat that was designed by Jacques Fauroux as a cruiser and first built in 1998.

The boat was also sold as the two-cabin Stardust 342 and three cabin Stardust 343 for use in the yacht charter role and was widely employed in  Europe, including in the Mediterranean Sea and the Aegean Sea.

Production
The design was built by Jeanneau in France, starting in 1998 and sold as the Sun Odyssey 34.2 for the European private market and with custom interiors, as the Stardust 342 and Stardust 343 for yacht charter operators. Starting in 1999 it was sold in the US market as the Jeanneau 34.2. It is now out of production.

Design
The Sun Odyssey 34.2 is a recreational keelboat, built predominantly of fiberglass, with wood trim. It has a masthead sloop rig a raked stem, a reverse transom with a swimming platform, an internally mounted spade-type rudder controlled by a wheel and a fixed fin keel or optional shoal-draft keel. It displaces  and carries  of ballast.

In the three cabin interior, the design has sleeping accommodation for six people, with a double "V"-berth in the bow cabin, a "U"-shaped settee in the main cabin and two aft cabins with a double berth in each. The galley is located on the port side, amidships and is equipped with a two-burner stove, an ice box and a double sink. A navigation station is opposite the galley, on the starboard side, aft. The head is located on the port side at the companionway ladder. The two cabin version has a single aft cabin and also a separate shower cabinet.

See also
List of sailing boat types

References

External links

Keelboats
1990s sailboat type designs
Sailing yachts
Sailboat type designs by Jacques Fauroux
Sailboat types built by Jeanneau